The Mindbender was an Anton Schwarzkopf looping roller coaster located at Galaxyland, a theme park located in West Edmonton Mall, in Alberta, Canada. The ride officially opened to the public on December 20, 1985 at a cost of $6 million. At  in height, it was the tallest indoor roller coaster in the world as of 2020.

On January 30, 2023, the mall announced that Mindbender had been decommissioned and closed after 37 years of service, in order to redevelop its space for new developments in the park.

Layout
Mindbender was designed by Germany's Werner Stengel and built by Anton Schwarzkopf. It was inspired by this team's previous design, Dreier Looping, a portable coaster that travelled the German funfair circuit, before being sold to a succession of amusement parks in Malaysia, Great Britain, Mexico, and most recently, Indiana Beach. Mindbender is a pseudo mirror-image of Dreier Looping, and is slightly taller, with additional helices at the end of the ride. Mindbender features shorter trains, with three pilot cars, whereas Dreier Looping usually ran with five trailer cars and one pilot car, occasionally rising to seven-car trains at busy funfairs.

The ride's layout features many twisting drops, three vertical loops and a double upward helix finale. The ride twists underneath, in between and around its supports. It also goes underneath the former UFO Maze attraction, which has been removed to make way for another roller coaster; Gerstlauer's Galaxy Orbiter, during the helix.

Often in high season, the last car on one of the trains is reversed, allowing guests to ride the roller coaster without being able to see where they are going.

Ride experience 
After boarding the Mindbender, riders put on their seatbelt and lap restraints.  Also, the ride operator lowers large shoulder restraints over the riders. All of the restraints keep the riders firmly secured in the seat.

After ascending the curving wheel driven lift hill, the train descends a sharp, twisting left-hand drop (sometimes referred to as a Traver drop) that climbs back up to the first of four stacked block brakes. The train negotiates a second left-hand drop that is immediately followed by the first two vertical loops. Then the train repeats the aforementioned process: it goes up to the third block brake, then does another twisting drop and ascent before hitting the fourth block brake. After the fourth block brake, the track drops to the left and back down to ground level, and hits the third vertical loop.

Following the third loop, the coaster train does another cycle under the stacked block brakes, then shoots along a two-layered upward helix, before running behind the Galaxy Quest 7D theater to hit the final brake run and the exit/entry area.

The ride length from the initial drop should normally range from one minute, five seconds, to one minute, twenty-five seconds. Circuit times as little as 59 seconds are possible through extensive waxing of the track, and reduction in tension on the bogey wheels. This increase in speed is not permitted during public rides, as the forces on the riders becomes severe. During testing of the renovated trains in 1987, the maximum g-force of a normal run was measured on equipment bolted into the train at 5.5 G's, which occurs in the third loop.

Accident

On the evening of 14 June 1986, the fourth car of a train travelling midway along the course derailed before encountering the third and final loop. Its wheel assembly had become detached from both the track and car itself, causing the car to sway back and forth across the tracks. The car became damaged, and the lap bar restraints unlocked and released, throwing all four of its passengers to the concrete floor below. The train continued to move along the track and into the final loop, but friction from the car's derailment slowed the train and prevented it from clearing the loop. As it rolled backward down the loop, the detached car crashed into a concrete pillar about midway down, stopping the train abruptly. Three of the four passengers thrown from the ride died, while the fourth was left critically injured with permanent, life-altering effects. The remaining passengers were safely evacuated and treated at a nearby hospital with minor injuries. An investigation later determined that four cap screws holding the wheel assembly together failed, which were likely the result of design flaws and unsatisfactory maintenance routines.

When Mindbender reopened in January 1987, the trains were redesigned. The existing four-car trains were converted to three-car trains (reducing seating capacity from 16 to 12), and anti-roll-back features were installed. Each train previously consisted of two wheel assemblies per car; however, after this accident, two further wheel assemblies were added to each car. The lap bar restraint was retained, but seat belts and shoulder headrests were added.

Awards

See also
Galaxy Orbiter

Notes

External links 
 Official Galaxyland Website

Roller coasters in Alberta
Roller coasters introduced in 1985
Mindbender accident
1986 disasters in Canada
1986 in Alberta
1985 establishments in Alberta